Lasell University (LU) is a private university in Auburndale, Massachusetts. Lasell offers undergraduate and graduate degrees in the liberal arts, sciences, and professional fields of study.

History

Lasell was founded in 1851 as the Auburndale Female Seminary by Williams College Professor of Chemistry, Edward Lasell, after he took a sabbatical from his job in Williamstown to teach at the Mount Holyoke Female Seminary in South Hadley, where the experience inspired him to invest more personally in women's education. He died of typhoid fever during the first semester, but his school proved highly successful as a first-rate educational institution and was soon renamed Lasell Female Seminary in his memory.

Its name later changed to Lasell Seminary for Young Women and, in 1874, governance was given to a board of trustees and Principal Charles C. Bragdon. Bragdon further expanded the faculty to make Lasell renowned as a more academically rigorous institution, a prestigious school with a highly scientific approach to domestic work, art, and music. As an innovative institution, known for a radical approach to women's education at the time, Lasell also administered the Harvard exams and offered law courses for women.

Lasell also offered two years of standard collegiate instruction as early as 1852 and is cited as having been the "first successful and persistent" junior college in the United States. In 1932, the college changed its name to Lasell Junior College, and the school officially began offering associate degrees in 1943. In 1989, Lasell adopted a charter to become a four-year institution (it no longer offers any two-year undergraduate degrees), and began admitting male students in 1997. Lasell also began offering master's degrees in 2002.

Lasell faced controversy in 2000 when seven former students sued and claimed that the nursing program, which had been discontinued in 1999, had been a sham. The following year, the college built Lasell Village, an elderly education facility in which residents paid to live and attend classes. Although the college argued that the property was in line with its non-profit mission and exempt from property taxes, the city successfully sued the college for not paying property taxes for the property.

In September 2010, a settlement was also filed in Suffolk Superior Court stipulating that Lasell would have to pay $191,314 to over 1,000 students over a conflict of interest in their Financial Aid Department. The investigation was done by the office of Attorney General Martha Coakley.

The college explored merging with Mount Ida College, another liberal arts institution located in Newton, in February 2018. The reasons given for the proposed merger were to help keep tuition cost as low as possible and maintaining academic quality.

In 2019, the institution's application to become a university was approved by the State Board of Education and it changed its name to Lasell University.

Academics

Lasell has been accredited by the Commission on Institution of Higher Education (CIHE) of the New England Association of Schools and Colleges (NEASC) since 1932 and offers bachelor's degrees in the liberal arts and professional disciplines. Through its "Connected Learning" program, students work on off-site projects and assignments. Lasell also offers graduate degrees in education, communication, sport management, athletic training, criminal justice, human resources, marketing, management (MS and MBA), and rehabilitation science.

In 2018, U.S. News & World Report listed Lasell College among only five other colleges with having 100 percent of its graduating seniors participate in an internship experience.

According to U.S. News & World Report, Lasell University has been ranked 9th for the category, "Great Schools at Great Prices" and ranked 25th for the "Best Regional College" in the North. Lasell ranked at 123 out of baccalaureate colleges in the United States for the Washington Monthly College Guide, ranking at number 3 specifically on "a combined measure of the number of staff supporting community service, relative to the total number of staff; the number of academic courses that incorporate service, relative to school size; and whether the institution provides scholarships for community service."

Fashion program
Lasell University is known for its emphasis and strength in its fashion program. Prospective students can major in Fashion Communication and Promotion, Fashion Retail & Merchandising, and Fashion Design & Production. The university is one of the few colleges that allow freshmen, sophomores, and juniors to showcase their garments in the annual undergraduate fashion show in the spring. Seniors show their final collections on a separate day and showcase eight looks that walk down the runway. The fashion shows are orchestrated by the other fashion students through weekly workshops and back to stage communication.

Lasell Works 
Lasell Works is a professionally focused, cost savings undergraduate program created by Lasell University to help lower the burden of higher education tuition. Students enrolled in the program spend their sophomore year living off-campus, taking all of their classes online, and working in a part-time job with ongoing mentor support. The program's declining tuition rate offers $22,000 in cost savings before financial aid is applied (as of 2019 rates).

Solstice Low-Residency MFA Program 
In 2022, Lasell acquired the Solstice Low-Residency MFA Program from Pine Manor College, where it had been hosted since 2006. Solstice is four-semester Master of Fine Arts program in creative writing. In the low-residency format, students complete five 10-day, on-campus residencies and four semesters in which they work with their faculty mentors remotely from their homes. Residencies occur in January and July and start the spring and fall semesters, respectively. Solstice students may concentrate in fiction, creative nonfiction, poetry, comics & graphic narratives, or writing for children and young adults.

Campus
There are approximately 58 buildings, 27 of which are student dormitories. Dormitories include 33 Victorian-era homes (built between 1837 and 1901), suite-style residence halls, and contemporary quad-style halls.

The college opened its Science and Technology Center (STC) in the fall of 2017.

Lasell's campus includes a day-care facility (the Barn), Rockwell Preschool, and Lasell Village, a senior living community focused on lifelong learning designated as an Age-Friendly University (AFU).

The campus is located about half a mile from the Auburndale Commuter Rail station on the Framingham/Worcester Line, and about one mile away from the Riverside MBTA Station on the Green Line's D train, which takes commuters into the downtown Boston area. A shuttle runs regularly between the campus and Riverside Station.

Student life
Of the 1,600 students who attend Lasell, 73% live on campus, 40% come from out-of-state (undergraduate students), and 22% are students of color. Roughly 36% of students at Lasell are male.

Athletics
Lasell University is a member of the National Collegiate Athletic Association's Division III athletics. The Lasell Lasers compete as members of Eastern College Athletic Conference, the North Atlantic Conference, and the Great Northeast Athletic Conferences in baseball, basketball, volleyball, soccer, cross-country, field hockey, softball, lacrosse, and track and field as inter varsity sports. In 2009, a mascot was introduced: Boomer the Torchbearer, named for the industrialists who sponsored Lasell's founding. Additionally, the school has a popular women's and men's rugby club, and has intramural sports such as flag football in the fall, as well as basketball in the winter.

Organizations
The student newspaper is called the 1851 Chronicle in reference to Lasell's founding year, and the student yearbook is called the Lamp. Polished Magazine is made by Lasell students/ A student-run online college radio station began operation in the fall of 2004; in 2016, the radio station began broadcasting on FM as WLAS-LP (102.9).

There are social justice, service-oriented, religious, and multicultural organizations: Umoja Step Team, Fashion and Service Society, Hope for Humanity, Hillel Club, Multicultural Student Union, Niños de Veracruz, Students Against Drunk Driving, and Students Advocating For Equality.

There are also academic organizations (Accounting/Finance, Fashion, Graphic Design, Hospitality, Psychology, Sports Management, and TV/Media) and athletic organizations (Cheerleading, Crew, Dance, Roller Hockey, Rugby, Skiing and Snowboarding, Tennis, and Wiffle Ball clubs).

Notable people

Alumni
 Annie Montague Alexander – explorer, naturalist, paleontological collector, philanthropist
 Martha Atwood – operatic soprano
 Sarah Lord Bailey – elocutionist and teacher
 Ada Langworthy Collier – poet, writer
 Nancy Donahue – fashion model
 Elizabeth Jane Gardner – American painter
 Louisa Venable Kyle – historian, author, journalist

Faculty
 James Anderson – government defense official and academic
 Anna Barrows – pioneering woman in the field of home economics
 Todd J. Leach – president of Granite State College, began his academic career at Lasell
 Mary Johnson Bailey Lincoln – considered one of the pioneers of the domestic science movement in the United States, taught at Lasell from 1885 to 1889
 Florence Jepperson Madsen – contralto singer, vocal instructor, and professor of music
 Rev. Dr. George McKendree Steele, D.D., LL.D. – educator and Methodist minister, former president of Lawrence University
 Lucy Johnston Sypher – children's book author

References

Further reading

External links
 Official website

Liberal arts colleges in Massachusetts
Universities and colleges in Newton, Massachusetts
Great Northeast Athletic Conference schools
Educational institutions established in 1851
1851 establishments in Massachusetts

Private universities and colleges in Massachusetts